Tung Yeung Shan is a mountain in Hong Kong at  in height. It is close to Tate's Cairn, one of the peaks of the Kowloon Ridge.

Stage 4 of the Wilson Trail passes over the mountain, while stage 4 of MacLehose Trail passes just below the summit of this peak to the north.

See also 
 Fei Ngo Shan Road
 Eight Mountains of Kowloon

References